Hacıəlibəy (also, Hacəlibəy and Mirzamamedkyshlakh) is a village and municipality in the Khachmaz Rayon of Azerbaijan.  It has a population of 2,230.

References 

Populated places in Khachmaz District